"Can the Can" is the second solo single by American singer-songwriter Suzi Quatro and her first to reach number one in the UK, spending a single week at the top of the chart in June 1973. It also reached number one on the European and Australian charts in whose market Quatro achieved her most consistent success throughout her career as a recording artist. The single belatedly became a hit in the US peaking at number 56 on the Billboard Hot 100 in 1976. It was re-released as a single in the UK, with "Devil Gate Drive" as the B-side, in 1984, but failed to chart. The single made the charts again in 1987 in the UK at number 87, it also appeared on her 1995 album What Goes Around.

This single made Quatro the first female bass guitar player to become a major rock star and therefore broke a barrier to women's participation in rock music.

Background
This, Quatro's second solo single, was released after she moved from the United States to Britain. In the United States, she had already released two singles with the all-female band The Pleasure Seekers. Her first solo single, "Rolling Stone," was recorded with session players. "Rolling Stone" only achieved popularity in Portugal, where it went to number one.

For "Can the Can," Quatro had organized her own band, which had toured the United Kingdom as the warm-up act for Slade and Thin Lizzy, and they had new songwriters/producers Mike Chapman and Nicky Chinn.

The song "Can the Can" was written, composed, and produced by Mike Chapman and Nicky Chinn. It has the refrain :

According to songwriter Nicky Chinn, the phrase "can the can" means "... something that is pretty impossible, you can't get one can inside another if they are the same size, so we're saying you can't put your man in the can if he is out there and not willing to commit."

The song "Ain't Ya Something Honey," with which "Can the Can" was backed, was written and composed by Quatro and produced by Mickie Most.

Accolades

Chart performance

Weekly charts

Year-end charts

Sales and certifications

See also
List of number-one singles in Australia during the 1970s
List of number-one hits of 1973 (Germany)
List of number-one singles from 1968 to 1979 (Switzerland)
List of UK Singles Chart number ones of the 1970s

References

1973 songs
1973 singles
1976 singles
Suzi Quatro songs
Number-one singles in Australia
Number-one singles in Germany
Number-one singles in Switzerland
UK Singles Chart number-one singles
RAK Records singles
Song recordings produced by Mike Chapman
Songs written by Mike Chapman
Songs written by Nicky Chinn